Christopher Charles French (born 1956) is a British psychologist specialising in the psychology of paranormal beliefs and experiences, cognition and emotion. He is the head of the University of London's anomalistic Psychology Research Unit and appears regularly in the media as an expert on testing paranormal claims.

Career
After French completed his PhD he taught adult education classes in which he also addressed astrology and extrasensory perception.

French is currently Professor Emeritus of Psychology at Goldsmiths College, University of London, and is head of their Anomalistic Psychology Research Unit which he founded in 2000.

On the importance of anomalistic psychology he said in an interview on The Skeptic Zone,

The focus of his current research is the psychology of paranormal beliefs and anomalous experiences. In addition to academic activities, such as conference presentations and invited talks in other departments, he frequently appears on radio and television presenting a sceptical view of paranormal claims. He has been consulted as an expert on a wide range of such claims including psychic abilities, recovered memory, telepathy, faith healing, past life regression, ghosts, UFO abductions, out-of-body experiences, astrology and so on.

Academia
French teaches a course entitled Psychology, Parapsychology and Pseudoscience as part of the BSc (Hons) Psychology programmes at both Goldsmiths College and Birkbeck College. He is a Chartered Psychologist and a Fellow of the British Psychological Society.

During his 2014 interview for the Skeptic Zone Podcast, Chris acknowledged that, as a sceptic, he believed in paranormal activities until he became more aware of the psychology behind why people believe, a point made clear to him through a book written by Professor of Psychology James Alcock:

He has authored or co-authored over 80 articles and chapters dealing with a wide variety of subjects in psychology, his work has been published in the Journal of Abnormal Psychology, the Quarterly Journal of Experimental Psychology, the British Journal of Psychology and the British Journal of Clinical Psychology.

In August 1996, he organised and chaired an integrated paper session on the topic of The Psychology of Paranormal and Pseudoscientific Beliefs at the XXVI International Congress of Psychology in Montreal.

He also contributed to a symposium on The Psychology of Anomalous Experience at the British Science Association annual British Science Festival at the University of Birmingham in September 1996.

In July 1997, he chaired a symposium on The Psychology of Paranormal Belief at the Fifth European Congress of Psychology in Dublin. He presented a paper at a conference on Paranormal and Superstitious Beliefs: A Skeptical Examination at Manchester Metropolitan University on Friday 13, November, 1998.

In February 1999, he contributed to a symposium of the Royal Statistical Society (which he co-organised). In July 1999, he co-organised and presented a paper at a half-day conference on Parapsychology: Current Status and Future Prospects at Goldsmiths College and gave a paper at the Sixth European Congress of Psychology in Rome. In February 2001, he gave an invited presentation to the Institute for Cultural Research at the Royal Society of Medicine and he has organised two symposia at major conferences (Glasgow, March 2001; London, July 2001).

In 2001, French tested the effects of crystal healing with the results suggesting that they are largely placebo effects. 80 volunteers were given a questionnaire to gauge their level of belief about paranormal phenomena. Later they were given what they were told was a genuine crystal, and asked to meditate for 10 minutes and then report the sensations they experienced. Half of the subjects had actually been given fake plastic crystals instead. French found no difference between the feelings reported between the two groups.

In 2004, French and colleagues conducted an experiment involving electromagnetic fields (EMF) and extremely low frequency sound waves (infrasound) phenomena that have been associated with allegedly haunted locations, the experiment did not establish a causal relationship between these phenomena and experiences of the subjects.

A study, led by French and published in 2008, explored the psychology of people who believed they had been abducted by aliens.

In January 2010, French was elected as a Fellow of the Committee for Skeptical Inquiry

French, Richard Wiseman and Stuart Ritchie each tried to replicate Daryl Bem's claim about psychic powers independently and failed at publishing their findings in high-profile journals. This is a common problem with publishing negative results, as novel research is more sought-after. They subsequently submitted their paper to PLOS One, an open access journal, of which's concept French became a supporter.

Science communication
French is a former Editor-in-Chief of The Skeptic (UK) magazine. He presided over a relaunch, in 2009, in which the magazine expanded to 40 pages and assembled an editorial advisory board, including many big names (e.g. Tim Minchin, Stephen Fry, Richard Wiseman, Simon Singh). From 2009 to 2016, French has been a columnist for The Guardian newspaper exploring scepticism and anomalistic psychology.

He has appeared on various science programmes (e.g. Equinox, ScienceNow, All in the Mind) and documentaries (e.g. Heart of the Matter, Everyman) as well as numerous discussion programmes (e.g. Esther; The Time, The Place; Kilroy; This Morning).

In 1997, he was one of three sceptics sitting on a panel for a 90-minute live debate on UFOs broadcast at peak viewing time by the Strange but True? team to mark the 50th anniversary of UFOs.

In 1998, he took part in an investigation of reincarnation claims amongst the Druze people of Lebanon, broadcast as part of the To the Ends of the Earth series. This involved spending around three weeks in Lebanon with a film crew.

He made regular appearances on ITV's programme Haunted Homes. He also makes appearances in the Channel 4 documentary series Tony Robinson and the Paranormal.

In November 2013, French was featured as the keynote speaker for the 2013 Australian Skeptics National Convention in Canberra.

In 2017, French attended the 17th European Skeptics Congress (ESC) in Old Town Wrocław, Poland. This was organised by the Klub Sceptyków Polskich (Polish Skeptics Club) and Český klub skeptiků Sisyfos (Czech Skeptic's Club). Here he appeared on a panel to discuss exorcisms. The panel was  chaired by Amardeo Sarma and included Mariusz Błochowiak, Konrad Szołajski and Jakub Kroulík.

Works

Book

Co-edited book

Selected book sections

Selected articles

References

External links 

 Chris French's Goldsmiths Homepage
 
 Student BMJ; Medicine and magic
 Science Weekly: The paranormal, The Guardian, 28 September 2009

1956 births
Living people
Academics of Birkbeck, University of London
Academics of Goldsmiths, University of London
Anomalistic psychology
Critics of parapsychology
English humanists
English psychologists
English sceptics
Place of birth missing (living people)
People from the Royal Borough of Greenwich
People associated with The Institute for Cultural Research